Nu Boyana Film Studios are film studios situated in Sofia, Bulgaria.

The film production complex was opened in 1962 and was state owned until 2005 when it was bought by one of the longest-running independent film companies in Hollywood, Nu Image and Millennium Films. With an approximate area of 30 hectares (75 acres), the complex features 10 sound stages and various standing sets – New York, London, Middle Eastern street, St Paul's Cathedral and a big ancient set, complete with a Roman colosseum.

Boyana Film was the main location for film production during the communist regime when Bulgarian cinema was at its peak.

Productions

Film
Most internationally popular films serviced at the studio:

The Black Dahlia (2006)
Hitman (2007)
War, Inc. (2008)
Universal Soldier: Regeneration (2009)
Ninja (2009)
Thick as Thieves (2009)
The Grudge 3 (2009)
The Fourth Kind (2009)
The Way Back (2010)
Conan the Barbarian (2011)
The Expendables 2 (2012)
Kon-Tiki (2012)
Getaway (2013)
Olympus Has Fallen (2013)
The Expendables 3 (2014)
300: Rise of an Empire (2014)
Automata (2014)
The Legend of Hercules (2014)
Stonehearst Asylum (2014)
Survivor (2015)
Septembers of Shiraz (2015)
 Kung Fury (2015)
Boyka: Undisputed (2016)
London Has Fallen (2016)
Mechanic: Resurrection (2016)
The Bleeder (2016)
Criminal (2016)
Vivegam (2017)
Loving Pablo (2017)
Leatherface (2017)
Hunter Killer (2017)
The Hitman's Bodyguard (2017)
Bullet Head (2017)
Security (2017)
Acts of Vengeance (2017)
The Wild Pear Tree (2018)
Rambo: Last Blood (2018)
The Angel (2018)
211 (2018)
Hellboy (2019)
Angel Has Fallen (2019)
After We Fell (2021)
Till Death (2021)
The Devil's Light (2021)
Hitman's Wife's Bodyguard (2021)
After Ever Happy (2022)
Cobweb (TBA)

Television
Absentia (2017) – AXN – Sony Pictures
Section Zero (2016) – Canal + Europa Corp.
Plebs (2013 Present) – ITV2
Ancient Rome: The Rise and Fall of an Empire (2006) – BBC
Barbarians Rising (2016) – History Channel
Spartacus (2004)
The Aliens (2016)
Stolen Life (2016) - Nova Television
Bromans (2017) - ITV2
The Outpost (2018) - The CW
Into the night (2020) - Netflix
Doctor Who (2020) - BBC One

Ukrainian Refugees 
Nu Boyana Studios started a program to help refugees fleeing the war in Ukraine.  They sent vehicles to pick up refugees crossing the Ukraine border to Moldova, and transported them to Bulgaria. Nu Boyana CEO Yariv Lerner said he put a call out that said, "To all those in need in the film industry, and if you're looking for work, we welcome you here."

References

External links 
 

Film studios
Cinema of Sofia
Companies based in Sofia
1962 establishments in Bulgaria
1962 establishments in California
Entertainment companies established in 1962